Richard Vuduc is a tenured professor of computer science at the Georgia Institute of Technology. His research lab, The HPC Garage, studies high-performance computing, scientific computing, parallel algorithms, modeling, and engineering. He is a member of the Association for Computing Machinery (ACM). As of 2022, Vuduc serves as Vice President of the SIAM Activity Group on Supercomputing. He has co-authored over 200 articles in peer-reviewed journals and conferences.

Education 
Dr. Vuduc received his Ph.D. in computer science from the University of California, Berkeley, in 2004. He received his B.S in computer science at Cornell University in 1997. He is also an alumnus of the Thomas Jefferson High School for Science and Technology in Alexandria, Virginia.

Academic career 
Vuduc was a Postdoctoral Scholar in the Center for Advanced Scientific Computing at the Lawrence Livermore National Laboratory. He has served as an associate editor of both the International Journal of High-Performance Computing Applications and IEEE Transactions on Parallel and Distributed Systems. He co-chaired the Technical Papers Program of the “Supercomputing” (SC) Conference in 2016 and was later elected to be Vice President of the SIAM Activity Group on Supercomputing from 2016 to 2018. He also served as department’s Associate Chair and Director of its graduate (MS & Ph.D.) programs from 2013-2016.

Major honors and awards 
 Member of the DARPA Computer Science Study Group
 Recipient NSF CAREER award
 Collaborative Gordon Bell Prize 2010
 Lockheed-Martin Aeronautics Company Dean’s Award for Teaching Excellence 2013
 Best Paper Awards, including the SIAM Conference on Data Mining (SDM, 2012) and IEEE Parallel and Distributed Processing Symposium (IPDPS, 2015)

Major publications

References 

Living people
Georgia Tech faculty
Cornell University alumni
Year of birth missing (living people)